KV Institute of Management and Information Studies (KVIMIS), also known as KVIM Business School or simply KVIM, is a private business school located in Coimbatore, Tamil Nadu, India. KVIM was founded in 2008 and is affiliated with Anna University. The B-school offers various MBA, PhD and executive education programmes.

Industry Institute Interface 
KVIM's Centre for Industry Institute Interface (CI3) with more than 150 partnerships in national and international avenues, arranges for elite interactions between the students and the corporate leaders of India and abroad related to Internships, Placements and Industrial visits. Industry takes a bigger role in setting curriculum and in mutual training with the fraternity.

References 

Business schools in Tamil Nadu
Universities and colleges in Coimbatore
2008 establishments in Tamil Nadu
Educational institutions established in 2008